Erinnyis is a genus of moths in the family Sphingidae first described by Jacob Hübner in 1819.

Species
Erinnyis alope (Drury, 1773)
Erinnyis crameri (Schaus, 1898)
Erinnyis ello (Linnaeus, 1758)
Erinnyis guttularis (Walker, 1856)
Erinnyis impunctata Rothschild & Jordan, 1903
Erinnyis lassauxii (Boisduval, 1859)
Erinnyis obscura (Fabricius, 1775)
Erinnyis oenotrus (Cramer, 1780)
Erinnyis pallida Grote, 1865
Erinnyis stheno (Geyer, 1829)
Erinnyis yucatana (H. Druce, 1888)

Gallery

References

 
Dilophonotini
Sphingidae of South America
Moths of South America
Moth genera
Taxa named by Jacob Hübner